The Fairmont Bridge is the first crossing of the Columbia River, at Fairmont Hot Springs, British Columbia. It carries British Columbia Highway 93/Highway 95 over a "creek-like segment" of the Columbia River between its source, Columbia Lake and Lake Windermere. The Fairmont Community Association also planned to route a trail built in 2017, the Fairmont Foot Path, over the bridge.

References

Bridges over the Columbia River
Road bridges in British Columbia